Farakou Massa is a rural commune in the Cercle of Ségou in the Ségou Region of Mali. The commune lies along the right bank of the River Niger and includes 8 villages in an area of approximately 109 square kilometers. In the 2009 census it had a population of 14,314. The administrative center (chef-lieu) of the commune is the village of Kominé which is 49 km northeast of Ségou.

References

External links
.

Communes of Ségou Region